Count of Penela was a Portuguese title of nobility. It was created on 10 October 1471 by King Afonso V of Portugal and granted to his 4th cousin, Dom Afonso de Vasconcelos e Menezes, 1st Count of Penela. 

Dom Afonso was close related to the Portuguese royal family, once his great-grandfather was Infante John of Portugal (son of Peter I of Portugal and Inês de Castro).

Genealogy Summary
                                Pedro I
                              (1320–1367)
                            King of Portugal
                                  |
        __|.............................
        |                         |                            :
        |                         |                            :
    Fernando I               Infante João                   João I
   (1345–1383)               (1349–1397)                  (1357–1433)
 King of Portugal      Duke of Valencia de Campos       King of Portugal
        |                   (Spanish title)                    |
        |                         :                            |
        |                         :                            |
        |                         :                            |
    Beatrice                   Afonso                      Duarte I
   (1372–1408)               (c.1370- ? )                 (1391–1438)
  Queen de jure            Lord of Cascais              King of Portugal
                                  |                            |
                                  |                            |
                                  |                            |
                       Fernando de Vasconcelos                 |
                             (c.1400- ? )                      |
                          Lord of Soalhães                     |
                                  |                            |
                                  |                            |
                                  |                            |
                        Afonso de Vasconcelos        Royal House of Portugal
                             (1441- ? )
                         1st Count of Penela

A second creation of this title occurred in December 1907, when King Charles I of Portugal granted it to José Maria de Portugal de Vasconcelos da Costa Mexia de Matos.

List of the Counts of Penela

First creation (1471)
Afonso de Vasconcelos e Menezes, 1st Count of Penela (born 1441)
João de Vasconcelos e Menezes, 2nd Count of Penela (born 1470)

Second Creation (1907)
José Maria de Portugal de Vasconcelos da Costa Mexia de Matos, 3rd Count of Penela (born 1868).

See also
List of Countships in Portugal

External links
Genealogy of the Counts of Penela, in Portuguese

Bibliography
"Nobreza de Portugal e do Brasil" – Vol. III, page 117/118. Published by Zairol Lda., Lisbon 1989.

Penela
Portuguese noble families
1471 establishments in Portugal